The 2015 IIHF Ice Hockey U20 World Championship Division II were the two international ice hockey tournaments organized by the International Ice Hockey Federation. Division II A was contested in Tallinn, Estonia and Division II B in Jaca, Spain.  These tournaments represent the fourth and fifth tiers of the World Junior Ice Hockey Championships.

Division II A
The Division II A tournament was played in Tallinn, Estonia, from 7 to 13 December 2014.

Participants

Final standings

Results
All times are local (Eastern European Time – UTC+2).

Statistics

Top 10 scorers

Goaltending leaders
(minimum 40% team's total ice time)

Awards

Best Players Selected by the Directorate
 Goaltender:  Attila Adorjan
 Defenceman:  Domanatas Cypas
 Forward:  Jordan Cownie

Division II B
The Division II B tournament was played in Jaca, Spain, from 13 to 19 December 2014.

Participants

Final standings

Results
All times are local (Central European Time – UTC+1).

Statistics

Top 10 scorers

Goaltending leaders
(minimum 40% team's total ice time)

Awards

Best Players Selected by the Directorate
 Goaltender:  Charlie Smart
 Defenceman:  Inigo Gainza
 Forward:  Luka Jarcov

References

External links
IIHF.com

II
World Junior Ice Hockey Championships – Division II
International ice hockey competitions hosted by Estonia
International ice hockey competitions hosted by Spain
2014–15 in Estonian ice hockey
2015 in Spanish sport